Bryan Nicholas Brooke MD, M.Chir.,  (21 February 1915– 18 September 1998) was a British surgeon and pioneer of surgery for ulcerative colitis.

Biography
The son of numismatist George C. Brooke, after education at Bradfield College, he matriculated at Corpus Christi College, Cambridge, where he graduated BA in 1936. After clinical training at St Bartholomew's Hospital, he qualified MRCS in 1939 and graduated MB BChir in 1940 and MChir in 1944 from the University of Cambridge. He was elected FRCS in 1942 and was chief surgical assistant at St Bartholomew's Hospital. In 1944 he joined the RAMC and served as a lieutenant colonel in charge of a surgical division.

After demobilisation, Brooke spent a year as a senior lecturer in Aberdeen. He joined in 1947 the new professorial surgical unit headed by Alan Stammers at Queen Elizabeth Hospital Birmingham. There, Lionel Hardy, (William) Trevor Cooke, and Clifford Hawkins were keenly interested in testing the newly introduced adherent Koening-Rutzen bag for potential ileostomy patients.

He received the higher MD from the University of Birmingham in 1954. He was appointed in 1963 the first professor of surgery at St George's Hospital and held that post until 1976.

Selected publications

Articles
 (See Trendelenburg position.)

Books

with Geoffrey Slaney: 

as editor with Andrew W. Wilkinson:

References

1915 births
1998 deaths
English surgeons
20th-century English medical doctors
People educated at Radley College
Alumni of Corpus Christi College, Cambridge
Alumni of the Medical College of St Bartholomew's Hospital
Academics of the University of Birmingham
Fellows of the Royal College of Surgeons
Royal Army Medical Corps officers
20th-century surgeons